Nora Clemens Sayre (September 20, 1932 – August 8, 2001) was an American film critic and essayist. She was a reviewer of films for The New York Times in the 1970s, and, from 1981, a writing teacher for many years at Columbia University. She specialised in the Cold War and authored books such as Running Time: Films of the Cold War (1982) in which she examined Hollywood movie-making in the 1950s.

Personal life
Born in Hamilton, Bermuda, her father was Joel Sayre of The New Yorker; family friends were A. J. Liebling and Edmund Wilson.

She attended Friends Seminary, and was a graduate of Radcliffe College.

A mentor was the English critic and book reviewer John Davenport; he had become acquainted with the Sayre family whilst working as a screenwriter at MGM, when she was a child, and would later visit the adult Sayre with suggestions of things she should read and about which she should write. Sayre noted "after a dose of Davenport, one was all the more responsive to words—either to classical or contemporary prose, or to the random eloquence of the street... his conversation made one immediately want to go home and write. Hence he served as an igniter: He gave one momentum."

She married the economist Robert Neild in 1957 but the marriage was dissolved four years later. She died in 2001, at the age of 68, in New York City.

Legacy
The Nora Sayre Endowed Residency for Nonfiction was created at Yaddo, an artists' community in Saratoga Springs, New York, to support her literary legacy.

Bibliography

 (1973) Sixties Going on Seventies (Arbor House; reprinted 1996, Rutgers University Press) 
 (1982) Running time: Films of the Cold War (Bantam Doubleday Dell Publishing Group) 
 (2001) On the Wing: A Young American Abroad (Counterpoint)

References

External links
New York Times obituary
Independent obituary

1932 births
2001 deaths
20th-century American essayists
20th-century American women
American women film critics
American film critics
American women essayists
People from Hamilton, Bermuda
Radcliffe College alumni
Columbia University faculty
Friends Seminary alumni